The fourth season of Swedish Idol premiered on September 3, 2007, and continued until its grand finale on 7 December, when 28-year-old Marie Picasso was crowned winner. It was the first season to feature an all-female finale, and is to date the only season to crown a winner who had previously fallen into the 'bottom three' during the finals, with Picasso landing there twice. It was the first season to hold its grand finale at the Globen Arena in Stockholm, and to date holds the record for the largest live audience at an Idol final anywhere in the world, with a crowd of 16,000 people. The finale also featured a live performance by Kelly Clarkson. It was the final season to feature judges Daniel Breitholtz, Peter Swartling and Kishti Tomita, who all bowed out for various personal reasons. Season 4 of Idol is also credited with discovering the unique talent of runner-up Amanda Jenssen, who went on to achieve enormous commercial and critical success in Sweden, and steady international notoriety.

Judges
 Daniel Breitholtz - Sony BMG manager
 Peter Swartling - Record producer
 Kishti Tomita - Vocal coach

Hosts
 Peter Jihde - Finals
 Carolina Gynning - Auditions and Semi-finals
 Carina Berg - Auditions and Semi-finals
 Hannah Graaf - Companion shows Idol Halvtid and Idol Eftersnack
 Doreen Månsson - Companion shows Idol Halvtid and Idol Eftersnack

Auditions
 Gothenburg: April 14, 2007
 Skellefteå: April 22, 2007
 Malmö: April 28, 2007
 Borlänge: May 6, 2007
 Stockholm: May 12, 2007

Eliminated Semi-finalists
 Pär Stenhammar - Eliminated September 24
 Särla Berntson - Eliminated September 25
 Michel Zitron - 1st eliminated September 28
 Tamela Hedström - 2nd eliminated September 28
 Knut Berggren - 3rd eliminated September 28

Elimination chart

Idol 2007 album

Det bästa från Idol 2007 (The Best from Idol 2007) is a sampling Swedish Idol 2007 shows. It was released on 21 November 2007.

External links
Marie Picasso from Big Brother in new idol season - Retrieved from Aftonbladet
Amanda Jensen - Sida om deltagaren Amanda Jensen
Official Website

2007 Swedish television seasons
Idol (Swedish TV series)
2007 in Swedish music